The Gulf is a play by American playwright Audrey Cefaly. It is a recipient of the 2017 Lambda Literary Award for Drama and the 2016 Edgerton Foundation New American Play Award. The play was adapted from a one-act version, which won the 40th Annual Samuel French Off Off Broadway Short Play Festival (2015). The play takes place on a fishing boat in the author's home state of Alabama.

Production highlights 
London Premiere - April 2018 (Tristan Bates Theatre)
Directed by Matthew Gould
Featuring Louisa Lytton and Anna Acton

Australian Premiere - August 2017 (Camperdown, NSW)
Directed by Melissa Lethbridge
Featuring Diana Popovska and Brenna Harding

World Premiere - September 2016 
Signature Theatre (Arlington, VA)
Directed by Joe Calarco.

Synopsis 
The divide between Kendra and Betty mimics the very world that devours them: a vast and polarizing abyss. On a quiet summer evening, somewhere down in the Alabama Delta, Kendra and Betty troll the flats looking for red fish.  After Betty begins diagnosing Kendra’s dead-end life with career picks from What Color is Your Parachute, their routine fishing excursion takes a violent turn.

Themes 
love, betrayal, apathy, lgbt, lesbian

Characters 
 Kendra: A loner. Scrappy, dark, brutish and volatile.
 Betty: An optimist. A thinker. Restless and tender Hearted.

Awards 
 Winner: 2017 Lambda Literary Award for Drama
 Nominated: 2017 Charles MacArthur Award for Outstanding Original New Play or Musical (Helen Hayes)
 Recipient of the 2016 Edgerton Foundation New American Play Award
 Winner of the 2015 Samuel French Off Off Broadway Short Play Festival.

Publications 
Full-Length (Samuel French)
One-Act: 
Off Off Broadway Festival Plays, 40th Series (Samuel French)
Love is a Blue Tick Hound (Samuel French)
Best American Short Plays 2014-2015 (Hal Leonard Corporation)

References

LGBT theatre in the United States
LGBT-related plays
American plays
2016 plays